Edward Monroe Hill (born in Hanford, California) is an American country music songwriter. Hill has been active since the early 1970s. Hill plays piano and keyboard and has backed Merle Haggard and Kris Kristofferson.
Hill joined the Palomino Club's house band, the Palomino Riders, in the late 1970s, and backed artists like Marty Robbins and Willie Nelson.
In 1980, he joined the Gilley's Urban Cowboy Band and won a Grammy Award for Best Country Instrumental Performance for "Orange Blossom Special/Hoedown".

In 1980 and 1982, he was nominated for an Academy of Country Music Award in the piano player category.

In late 1987, he joined New Haven Music which was sold to BMG in 1997.

He has won four Nashville Songwriters Association International Awards for "Songs I Wish Had Written". They include: It Matters To Me by Faith Hill, Georgia Rain by Trisha Yearwood, Find Out Who Your Friends Are by Tracy Lawrence and Just Fishin' by Trace Adkins.

In 2012, Hill was nominated for a Grammy Award in the Best Country Song category for Just Fishin' written with Casey Beathard and Monty Criswell.

Singles written or co-written by Ed Hill
 2011 – Just Fishin' – Trace Adkins – Broadcast Music, Inc. 1 Million-Air Award
 2010 – I'm All About It – Randy Houser
 2008 – Hold On To Me – Rissi Palmer
 2008 – That's a Man-  Jack Ingram
 2007 – Spoken Like a Man – Blaine Larsen
 2007 – Find Out Who Your Friends Are – Tracy Lawrence – Broadcast Music, Inc. 2 Million-Air Award
 2007 – How 'bout Them Cowgirls – George Strait – Broadcast Music, Inc. 1 Million-Air Award
 2005 – Songs About Me – Trace Adkins – Broadcast Music, Inc. 1 Million-Air Award
 2005 – Somebody's Hero – Jamie O'Neal
 2005 – Georgia Rain – Trisha Yearwood
 2004 – Goes Good With Beer John Michael Montgomery
 2004 – You Do Your Thing – Montgomery Gentry
 2004 – I Wish – Jo Dee Messina
 2004 – How Far –  Martina McBride 1994
 2002 – One More Time – Kenny G / Chanté Moore
 2000 – There You Are –  Martina McBride – Broadcast Music, Inc. 1 Million-Air Award
 1999 -Whatever You Say – Martina McBride – Broadcast Music, Inc. 2 Million-Air Award
 1999 – She's Always Right – Clay Walker
 1998 – Buckaroo – Lee Ann Womack
 1998 – Just Another Heartache – Chely Wright
 1998 – Ordinary People – Clay Walker
 1997 – One, Two, I Love You – Clay Walker
 1997 – What If I Do-  Mindy McCready
 1996 – C-O-U-N-T-R-Y – Joe Diffie
 1995 – The Heart Is a Lonely Hunter – Reba McEntire – Broadcast Music, Inc. 2 Million-Air Award
 1995 – It Matters To Me – Faith Hill – Broadcast Music, Inc. 3 Million-Air Award
 1994 – Be My Baby Tonight – John Michael Montgomery – Broadcast Music, Inc. 5 Million-Air Award
 1992 – Runnin' Behind – Tracy Lawrence – Broadcast Music, Inc. 2 Million-Air Award
 1991 – In a Different Light- Linda Davis
 1989 – 'Til Love Comes Again – Reba McEntire

References 

American country singer-songwriters
American male singer-songwriters
People from Hanford, California
Year of birth missing (living people)
Living people
Singer-songwriters from California
Country musicians from California